The discography of experimental ensemble The Golden Palominos, fronted by drummer Anton Fier.

Studio albums

As Blind Light

Singles

Compilation albums

References

External links
 The Golden Palominos at AllMusic
 
 

Discographies of American artists
Alternative rock discographies